Sungi Mlengeya (born 1991), is a Tanzanian self-taught artist who primarily uses acrylic paint on canvas to create minimalistic portrait paintings which make use of negative space. Her art centres on black women to reveal narratives of their self-discovery and empowerment.

Childhood
Both of Mlengeya's parents were veterinarians, and as a result she had a peaceful and quiet upbringing, living in a national park. To pass the time, she and her sister spent a lot of time doing crafts, inspired by their mother's 'Woman's Value' magazines. This creativity continued in primary school, where she loved art and found it fun to draw, however, ended up talking a long break from art in secondary school as art classes were not taught there.

Introduction to the art world 
For Mlengeya, painting was something that she did on the side-lines during the start of her banking career upon graduating during 2013. But, in 2018, she left her job in banking to take up a career in painting and turned to the internet to learn new techniques and tips to improve her practice.

She sold her first piece in Arusha, her hometown, with the help of one of her close friends - "who, unlike me, has exceptional marketing and social skills" according to Mlengeya. With more faith in her work, she embarked on a trip throughout East Africa, to familiarise herself with artists and galleries. This is where she encountered the Afriart Gallery that introduced her to the global art world.

Early works 
Mlengeya's earlier work differs from her later work through its use of bold colour whereas in her more recent work she focuses on white backgrounds.  For example, 'Strips', which appears on the 'Early works' page of her website, features Mlengeya's recognizable use of negative space, but also incorporates highly saturated strips of red and yellow within the piece.

Exhibitions
Mlengeya has taken part in many exhibitions. In February 2020, Mlengeya had her own solo booth at the Investec Cape Town Art Fair. 

During the COVID-19 pandemic, Mlengeya took part in online exhibitions. One of these was Unit London's 'Drawn Together', which ran from 11 June to 26 July 2020 where she exhibited a piece called 'Friend'. This exhibit featured more than 150 international artists, and all the proceeds from went towards two charity organizations, Medicins Sans Frontieres and World Vision. 

Mlengeya also participated in a New York exhibit featuring 25 women artists of African descent called 'A Force for Change' where she displayed her piece 'Up'. 'A Force for Change' ran from 27 July to 31 July 2021.

Just Disruptions 
'Just Disruptions' was Mlengeya's debut solo exhibition that ran from 19 June 2021 to 19 August 2021 at the Afriart Gallery in Kampala. 

'Just Disruptions' is a collection of pieces which not only show the development of Mlengeya's style, but also manifest the growth of black women and their road to change how they are perceived which in turn, 'challenges our short span attention economy'. Mlengeya puts emphasis on 'identity', whether that be through the blocked-out bodies in her pieces or the questions surrounding these works, it culminates to 'freeing' black women from the expectations that are both consciously and unconsciously put onto the community.

2022 Exhibitions 
The artist’s 2022 solo exhibition 'Don’t Try, Don’t Not Try' with the B LA Art Foundation in Vienna from 20-22 September partly benefited Women without Borders whose headquarters are also in the city. '(Un)Choreographed', another solo exhibition that opened in June 2022 marked the reopening of the home of London’s Africa Centre in Southwark.

References 

African artists
Contemporary painters
1991 births
Living people